Jake Goldberg (born February 7, 1996) is an American actor who played Greg Feder in Grown Ups and Grown Ups 2. On January 15, 2014, Goldberg was nominated for a Golden Raspberry Award, along with the rest of the cast of the film Grown Ups 2. He attended the University of Colorado Boulder. On the Nick Jr. program The Backyardigans, he provided the voice of Pablo The Blue penguin.

Filmography

References

External links

1996 births
American male child actors
Living people
University of Colorado Boulder alumni
Male actors from New York City
People from Chappaqua, New York
Jewish American male actors
21st-century American Jews